The  is a  commuter railway line in Japan owned and operated by the private railway operator Keikyu.

Service outline
Three service types operate on the Keikyu Zushi Line, as shown below. All services stop at all stations between Kanazawa-hakkei and Shinzushi.
 
In the early morning and late night, all-stations local trains shuttle between Kanazawa-hakkei and Zushi·Hayama. Other local trains run through to/from the Keikyu Main Line.
 
Since 16 May 2010, Airport Express services run to/from  via the Keikyu Airport Line.
 
There are only six limited express trains a day.

Stations

History
Jimmuji Station opened on 1 April 1931.

Station numbering was introduced from 21 October 2010.

See also
 List of railway lines in Japan

References

External links
 

 
Zushi Line
Railway lines in Kanagawa Prefecture